Whitehouse is a hamlet on the Kintyre peninsula of Argyll and Bute, Scotland.

References

External links
 

Villages in Kintyre